Velesovo is a settlement in the Municipality of Cerklje na Gorenjskem in the Upper Carniola region of Slovenia.

References

External links
Velesovo on Geopedia

Populated places in the Municipality of Cerklje na Gorenjskem